Simon Kimbangu (September 12, 1887 – October 12, 1951) was a Congolese religious leader who founded the Christian new religious movement Kimbanguism. Kimbanguists consider him to be an incarnation of the Holy Spirit.

Biography
Kimbangu was born at Nkamba, near Thysville, in 1887. The son of a traditional religious leader, he became a Baptist in 1915, and worked as a catechist for several years before beginning his own ministry in early 1921. According to his disciples, Kimbangu cured the sick, raised the dead back to life, prophesied the future and the liberation of black people. His ministry developed a large following, causing suspicion amongst the Belgian authorities. His ministry of preaching and miraculous healing lasted from April to September 1921. Within a short time he attracted large crowds.

According to Dr. Bertram Melbourne, both the Protestant and the Catholic religious establishments became alarmed and appealed to the colonial authorities who sought his arrest. David van Reybrouck, however, indicated that the Belgian administrator, Léon Morel, became concerned and invited Catholic and Protestant missionaries to a meeting in Thysville. While the Catholics supported a vigorous intervention, the Protestants favored a soft approach as they saw it as a form of Christian devotion. The hardliners prevailed and Kimbangu and followers were arrested on 6 June 1921, but Kimbangu escaped with some of his disciples and his son, Charles, into the bush.

His ministry continued in hiding, but in September he turned himself in. He was placed before a military court, without the benefit of a legal representative, and found guilty of undermining public security and disturbing the peace. On 3 October 1921, he was sentenced to death. King Albert I commuted his sentence to life imprisonment. He was moved to the prison in Elisabethville where he died on 12 October 1951.

During his thirty years of imprisonment, he continued to be regarded as a spiritual leader and people claimed to see him appear at many places at the same time, continuously being in contact with his followers and family by appearing to them and giving them missions. According to an eyewitness account by a military guard based at Kimbangu's prison, Kimbangu is said to have prophesied the day and time of his death. He has since become a symbol of Congolese nationalism.

The Kimbanguist Church
After Simon Kimbangu's trial, the administration tried to suppress the movement. Followers were banished to different parts of the country and their faith was outlawed. In 1940, the highest ranking exiles were placed in guarded work camps and subjected to forced labor; many died. However, as a result of the persecution, the Church spread in the underground and reached people in other areas. Eventually, in 1959, the Kimbanguist Church was recognized by the Belgian government and could then conduct prayer freely.

Today, the Kimbanguist Church is well established in many countries. When Kimbangu died, his son Joseph Diangienda, who Kimbanguists and other's claim is the second incarnation of Simon Kimbangu (as he prophesied in 1910) took over the Church ministry. Joseph Diangienda (chief spiritual) organized the contemporary Church. Diangienda (born 22 March 1918) died on 8 July 1992 in Switzerland and was succeeded by his elder brother Salomon Dialungana Kiangani, who Kimbanguists also claim is The Lord Jesus Christ reincarnated back to mankind whose son, Simon Kimbangu Kiangani the grandson of Simon Kimbangu and who the Kimbanguist Church today claims is Simon Kimbangu resurrected, is now the spiritual leader based at the Church's headquarters in Nkamba.

See also

Simon-Pierre Mpadi
Mandombe script
Orchestre Symphonique Kimbanguiste

References

External links
Bethel University site
Encyclopædia Britannica
Dictionary of African Christian Biography: Simon Kimbangu, article reprinted from An African Biographical Dictionary, copyright © 1994, edited by Norbert C. Brockman, Santa Barbara, California.

1887 births
1951 deaths
African Christians
People from Kongo Central
Founders of new religious movements
Belgian Congo people
Prisoners who died in Belgian detention
Prisoners sentenced to death by Belgium
20th-century Christian martyrs